Elizabeth "Libby" Wong Chien Chi-lien  (Chien) is a former civil servant and politician from Hong Kong, born in Shanghai, China. Wong holds New Zealand citizenship, and is currently residing in Sydney. She is now a popular fiction writer. Her novels in English and Chinese are Rainbow City and its sequel Flower Mountain.
Elizabeth's husband is third generation Chinese New Zealanders, Elizabeth settled in Australia some years ago.

Wong served in the Hong Kong Government as the Director of Social Welfare from March 1987 to February 1990, and Secretary for Health and Welfare from February 1990 to 1994. She was a member of the Legislative Council from 1995 to 1997. In 1997, she quit politics to write.

References

External links

Hong Kong justices of the peace
1937 births
Living people
Commanders of the Order of the British Empire
Companions of the Imperial Service Order
Hong Kong civil servants
Government officials of Hong Kong
Hong Kong novelists
New Zealand women novelists
Australian people of Chinese descent
New Zealand people of Chinese descent
Alumni of the University of Hong Kong
Alumni of St. John's College, University of Hong Kong
The Frontier (Hong Kong) politicians
Writers from Shanghai
Politicians from Shanghai
HK LegCo Members 1988–1991
HK LegCo Members 1995–1997
20th-century New Zealand novelists
20th-century New Zealand women writers
20th-century Hong Kong women politicians